The National Assembly is lower house of the Parliament of Ivory Coast since November 2016. From 1960 to 2016, the National Assembly was Ivory Coast's unicameral legislative body.  Evolved from semi-representative bodies of the French Colonial period, the first National Assembly was constituted on 27 November 1960 with 70 elected members (députés) in accordance with the  Constitution of 31 October 1960, which created the First Republic.

Legislative power in Ivory Coast is exercised by Deputies elected from Constituencies (Circonscriptions) by a Scrutin de Liste or Plurality-at-large voting which has neither a proportional representation or panachage element common in many such systems. The powers of this Assembly expire at the end of its second regular session (session ordinaire) in the fifth year of its mandate.  The Assembly is then reformed by election from candidates who must be Ivorian citizens of 25 years or older who have never renounced their Ivorian nationality.

The first National Assembly of the Second Republic of Ivory Coast elected for the period 2000–2005 was marked by both internal political crisis and the Ivorian Civil War. No elections were held in 2005, but with the peace deal ending the Civil War, elections are expected on 30 November 2008.

The 2011 Ivorian parliamentary election was dominated by the Rally of the Republicans, the party of President Alassane Ouattara, followed by the Democratic Party of Côte d'Ivoire – African Democratic Rally. The current National Assembly is made up of 255 elected officials, with the National Assembly president post being vacant.

Presidents of the National Assembly
Below is a list of presidents of the Conseil général:

Below is a list of presidents of the Territorial Assembly:

Below is a list of presidents of the National Assembly:

Last election results

See also
History of Ivory Coast
Legislative Branch
Politics of Ivory Coast
List of national legislatures

References

Portions of this article were translated from the French language Wikipedia entry :fr:Assemblée nationale (Côte d'Ivoire), 2008-08-18.

External links
Official website

Politics of Ivory Coast
Political organizations based in Ivory Coast
Ivory Coast
Organizations based in Abidjan
1960 establishments in Ivory Coast
Government agencies established in 1960
Ivory Coast